The 8 mm backup format is a magnetic tape data storage format used in computer systems, pioneered by Exabyte Corporation.  It is also known as Data8, often abbreviated to D8 and is written as D-Eight on some Sony branded media. Such systems can back up up to 60 GB of data depending on configuration. The cassettes have the same dimensions and construction as the cassettes used in 8 mm video format recorders and camcorders.

Until the advent of AIT, Exabyte were the sole vendor of 8 mm format tape drives. The company was formed with the aim of taking the 8 mm video format and making it suitable for data storage.  They did so by building a reliable mechanism and data format that used the common 8 mm helical scan video tape technology that was available then.

Exabyte's first 8 mm tape drive was made available in 1987.  This was followed up with their Mammoth tape drive in 1996, and the Mammoth-2 (M2) in 1999.

Exabyte's drive mechanisms were frequently rebranded and integrated into UNIX systems.

Generations 
NOTE: The AIT and VXA formats and some other less common formats also use 8 mm wide tape, but are completely incompatible.

Compatibility between tapes and drives and native capacities (GB) 

Legend:
 RO - The tape drive can read this tape, but not write. (Read Only)
 Y - The tape drive can read and write this tape, but size is not known.
 Numbered entries indicate the native storage capacity (in GB) for this combination of tape and drive.

Exabyte 8 mm 
These drives use metal particle (MP) tape.

 1987—EXB-8200
 Full-Height form factor
 246 kB/s data transfer rate
 EXB-8200SX model features high-speed search
 EXB-8205: Up to 5.0 GB on one 112 m data cartridge (assuming 2:1 compression ratio)
 EXB-8205XL: Up to 7.0 GB on one 112 m data cartridge (assuming 2:1 compression ratio)
 1990—EXB-8500
 Full-Height form factor
 500 kB/s data transfer rate
 EXB-8500c model features hardware data compression
 1992—EXB-8505
 Half-Height form factor
 500 kB/s data transfer rate (uncompressed) / 1.0 MB/s data transfer rate (assuming a 2:1 compression ratio)
 Up to 10.0 GB on one 112 m data cartridge (assuming 2:1 compression ratio)
 1994—EXB-8505XL
 Half-Height form factor
 500 kB/s data transfer rate (uncompressed) / 1.0 MB/s data transfer rate (assuming a 2:1 compression ratio)
 Up to 14.0 GB on one 160 m XL data cartridge (assuming 2:1 compression ratio)
 1995—EXB-8700
 Tabletop (top-loading) form factor
 8700 model included generic backup software
 8700LT model included no software
 8700SW included Cheyenne backup software
 1998—Eliant 820
 Half-Height form factor

Mammoth 
These drives use Advanced Metal Evaporated (AME) tape, but could also read (but not write) MP tapes.

 1996—EXB-8900 Mammoth
 3 MB/s data transfer rate
 LCD on drive displayed drive status
 1999—Mammoth-LT
 No LCD

Mammoth-2 (M2)
These drives used Advanced Metal Evaporated (AME) tape with a 2 m integrated cleaning tape header called Smart Clean.
 1999—Mammoth-2
 12 MB/s data transfer rate
 4.6 cm/s tape speed during normal read/write operations
 1.6 m/s tape speed during search and rewind operations
 17 s load time, from insertion to ready
 ALDC hardware data compression, 1 kB compression buffer

See also 
 Digital Data Storage

External links
  A brief history of tape according to Exabyte
 Much Ado About Exabyte
 Identifying MammothTape and 8 mm tape drives
 Mammoth-2 Product Specification
 Technical details for several Data8 products

Standards 
 ECMA-145 ISO/IEC 11319:1991 First specification for 8 mm tape data storage. 
 ECMA-169 ISO/IEC 12246:1993, Specification of DA-1 (dual azimuth extension). 
 ECMA-249 ISO/IEC 15757, Specification of DA-2 (MammothTape). 
 ECMA-293 ISO/IEC 18836, Specification of MammothTape-2. 

Computer storage tape media